The Jamaican giant gecko (Tarentola albertschwartzi), also known commonly as Schwartz's wall gecko, is a species of lizard in the family Phyllodactylidae. The species is endemic to Jamaica.

Etymology
The specific name, albertschwartzi, is in honor of American herpetologist Albert Schwartz.

Taxonomy
T. albertschwartzi is only known from a single specimen uncovered in the late 1990s in a museum in Scotland; this specimen was entered into the collection in 1884 and labelled as from Jamaica. The species is possibly extinct.

References

Further reading
Carranza S, Arnold EN, Mateo JA, López-Jurado LF (2000). "Long-distance colonization and radiation in gekkonid lizards, Tarentola (Reptilia: Gekkonidae), revealed by mitochondrial DNA sequences". Proceedings of the Royal Society B: Biological Sciences 267: 637–649.
Rösler H (2000). "Kommentierte Liste der rezent, subrezent und fossil bekannten Geckotaxa (Reptilia: Gekkonomorpha)". Gekkota 2: 28–153. "Tarentola (Neotarentola) albertschwartzi ", new combination, p. 115. (in German).
Sprackland RG, Swinney GN (1998). "A new species of giant gecko of the genus Tarentola (Reptilia: Squamata: Gekkonidae) from Jamaica". Journal of Zoology 245 (1): 73–78. (Tarentola albertschwartzi, new species).
Wilson BS (2011). "Conservation of Jamaican amphibians and reptiles". In: Hailey A (2011). Conservation of Caribbean Island Herpetofaunas Volume 2: Regional Accounts of the West Indies. Leiden, Netherlands: Brill. 440 pp. .

Tarentola
Reptiles described in 1998